Pastré or Pastre may refer to:

People
Eugène Pastré (1806–1868), French shipowner from Marseille
Geneviève Pastre (1924-2012), French poet and lesbian activist
Count Jean Pastré (1888-1960), French polo player
Jean-Baptiste Pastré (1804-1877), French banker and arms-dealer
Jonet-Pastré, French Olympic sailor
Jules Pastré (1810-1902), French banker, businessman and equestrian 
Countess Lily Pastré (a.k.a. Marie-Louise Double de Saint-Lambert) (1891-1974), French heiress and patron of the arts
Michel Pastre (born 1966), French jazz saxophonist
Nicole Véra Claire Hélène Maurice Pastré, 7th Princess Murat, wife of Joachim, 7th Prince Murat
Olivier Pastré (born 1950), French banker and economist
Ulysse Pastre (1864-1930), French politician

Places
Château Pastré, a chateau in Marseille.